The Vulcana is a right tributary of the river Ialomița in Romania. It discharges into the Ialomița in Șotânga.

References

Rivers of Romania
Rivers of Dâmbovița County